Payot is a French surname that may refer to
Charles Payot (1901–?), French Olympic ice hockey player
Étienne Payot (1900–?), French Olympic bobsledder
Jules Payot (1859–1939), French educationist
Lolette Payot (1910–), Swiss-French tennis player
Martial Payot (1900–1949), French Olympic skier
 (1887–1966), French doctor, businesswoman, the founder of the luxury beauty brand 
Philippe Payot (1893–1958), French Olympic ice hockey player, brother of Charles
Venance Payot (1826-1902), French naturalist, glaciologist, Chamonix mountain guide.